Sargento Foods Inc. is an American food producer best known for its cheese. It was founded in 1953 in Plymouth, Wisconsin by Leonard Gentine and Joseph Sartori. The company name is a combination of Sartori and Gentine, with an "o" added to make the name sound Italian, as the company specialized in Italian-style cheeses. Sargento is one of the largest privately held companies in the United States, and is one of the country's largest retail cheese companies. The company offers profit sharing, tuition reimbursement and benefits for its employees. The company has been a sponsor in American motorsports for many years;  for example, it is prominently displayed on Road America raceway.

Products
Sargento was the first company to sell packaged shredded cheese, and the first to develop zippered packaging for its cheeses. The company also produces and markets specialty cheeses, which it purveys on its website and in catalogs. Additional products include sauces, snack cheeses and snack foods, and the company also manufactures custom cheese and food products for corporate clients.

In early 2017, Sargento recalled seven cheeses for possible listeria contamination.

Works
 Sargento Foods Inc. (2012). Pizza Recipes. Publications International. 
 Publications International Staff (2010). Sargento Mac and Cheese Recipes. Publications International, Limited. 
Treated Like Family: How an Entrepreneur and His "Employee Family" Built Sargento, a Billion-Dollar Cheese Company. by Tom Faley

See also

 List of cheesemakers
 List of dairy product companies in the United States

References

External links
 Official website

Dairy products companies of the United States
Cheesemakers
Food and drink companies based in Wisconsin
Food and drink companies established in 1953
1953 establishments in Wisconsin
American companies established in 1953